Scipio is an unincorporated community in Franklin County, Indiana and Butler County, Ohio, United States. It is at the intersection of State Routes 126 and 129.

History
Scipio was platted in 1826.

The post office Scipio once contained had the name Philanthropy. It operated from 1836 until 1839.

References

Unincorporated communities in Franklin County, Indiana
Unincorporated communities in Butler County, Ohio
Unincorporated communities in Ohio
1827 establishments in Ohio
Populated places established in 1827
Unincorporated communities in Indiana